HLA is a time signal radio station in Daejeon, South Korea, operated by the Korea Research Institute of Standards and Science.  Established on November 24, 1984, it transmits a 2 kW signal on 5 MHz (±0.01 Hz).  Originally only transmitted for 7 hours per day (01:00–08:00), 5 days per week (M–F), it is continuous as of 2011.  There are over 100 users of the signal in Korea.

It broadcasts a time signal similar to that of the WWV and WWVH stations with which it shares a frequency:
 Second pulses are 5 ms (9 cycles) of 1800 Hz, beginning on the second
 Seconds 29 and 59 are omitted
 Minute markers are 800 ms of the same frequency
 Hour markers are 800 ms of 1500 Hz
 DUT1 is encoded using doubled pulses
 Voice time announcements are made after second 52
 A time code is transmitted on a 100 Hz subcarrier

References

External links
HLA This link is no longer valid.
KRISS time and frequency dissemination This link is no longer valid.

Radio stations established in 1984
1984 establishments in South Korea
Radio stations in South Korea
Mass media in Daejeon